Lestoidea lewisiana is a species of Australian damselfly in the family Lestoideidae,
commonly known as a Mount Lewis  bluestreak. 
It has only been recorded at Mount Lewis in north-east Queensland, where it inhabits streams in rainforest.

Lestoidea lewisiana is a medium-sized to large damselfly, dark coloured with dull orange to greenish markings.

Gallery

See also
 List of Odonata species of Australia

References 

Lestoideidae
Odonata of Australia
Insects of Australia
Endemic fauna of Australia
Taxa named by Günther Theischinger
Insects described in 1996
Damselflies